("The Little Cottage") is a royal wendy house standing close to Royal Lodge within Windsor Great Park in England since 1932.

History
The two-thirds scale thatched cottage was a gift to Princess Elizabeth for her sixth birthday (later Queen Elizabeth II) from the people of Wales and placed in the grounds of Royal Lodge.

Designed by architect Edmund Willmott as a Welsh-cottage style playhouse, it measures 24 feet long, eight feet deep and with a ceiling height of five feet. Built from materials left over from the redevelopment of Llandough Hospital, it has four rooms: kitchen; living room; and accessed via oak stairs a bedroom; and a bathroom. Services include full running hot and cold water, electricity and a heated towel rail in the bathroom. The kitchen has a working fridge, gas cooker and a miniature blue and white porcelain dining and tea set. In the living room is a working miniature radio, a little oak dresser, a bookcase filled with Beatrix Potter's books, and a picture of their mother the Duchess of York hangs over the oak mantlepiece.

On 17 February 1932, an insurance policy for the house was taken out in the name of Princess Elizabeth of York. On being transported from its construction site in the Welsh Valleys to Drill Hall, Cardiff, the tarpaulin covering the house caught fire, damaging the cottage. Quickly repaired under the insurance policy, the house was presented to Duke of York and his wife on their visit to Greyfriars Hall, Cardiff, on 16 March 1932. The keys were presented to the royal couple by school girl Jean Blake, daughter of plumber and engineer William Blake who helped to construct the cottage, on behalf of the "Princess Elizabeth Model House Committee". Initially put on public display at the Daily Mail-sponsored Ideal Home Exhibition at the Olympia exhibition centre, London, it was then sent on a tour of the UK to raise funds for children's hospital charities. Fully repaired, it was sited on its final location close to Royal Lodge in Windsor Great Park, before the Princesses were allowed to play with it from December 1933.

In 2012 as part of the Queen's Diamond Jubilee, it was restored under a plan initiated and managed by Princess Beatrice, paid for by her father Prince Andrew, Duke of York. Restored under a pale green and cream colour scheme, the works included new curtains and upholstery, the paintwork was refreshed, the roof was rethatched and the cottage rewired.

Further reading

References

External links
 , at Royal Collection Trust
 
 

Buildings and structures in Windsor Great Park
Thatched buildings in England
1932 establishments in England
Royal residences in the United Kingdom
Elizabeth II